Sabyasachi Mohapatra (born 27 August 1950 in Lehedi, India) is an Indian film director, writer, and producer in Odia cinema. He owns a production house named Mohapatra Movie Magic.

Career
Mohapatra made his directorial debut in film Bhukha in Sambalpuri Language that won International Jury award at Gijon Film festival in Spain.

His movie Jai Jagannatha released in 2006, a mythological film, was a mega-budget released in 15 different Indian languages.

After 25 years, director Sabyasachi Mohapatra is back with Sala Budha in 2012. The film is based on a novel by renowned author Kapilesh Prasad Mohapatra (his father),the film was screened at the International Film Festival of in Goa, India in 2013 and the film won seven awards, including the best actor award, at the Odisha state film awards.

He directed another Sambalpuri language film Aadim Vichar released in 2014 and the film won 62nd National Film Awards in Best Feature Film in Odia and also won Best director and Best actor award at 26th Odisha State Film Awards.

In 2015,he worked on his next project 'Pahada Ra Luha' and which earned him back-to-back National Film Awards. The film won Best Feature Film in Odia at 63rd National Film Awards in 2015.

Filmography

Awards
 Ganakabi Samman awarded by Ganakabi Baishnab Pani Jayanti Committee in 2017.
 International Jury award
Odisha Living Legend Award 
 Sambhabana Oriya cinema award

References

External links
 

1950 births
Living people
People from Subarnapur district
Odia film directors
Odia film producers
Odia screenwriters
Film producers from Odisha
Film directors from Odisha
20th-century Indian film directors
21st-century Indian film directors